Markee Ledge (born Mark Davies; 1974 in Springburn, Glasgow, Scotland) is a founding member of British electronic music group Kosheen.

Markee began his musical production career on Ruffneck Ting as Substance releasing projects such as 'Homeboyz', 'Damn Right' and 'LF-Ant' and with vocalist Hazel, on his first album release "Substance Spectrum" was released on RuffNeck Ting Records in 1998.
<ref name="Discogs">{{cite news|url=http://www.discogs.com/Various-Substance-Spectrum/release/175165 |title=Various – Substance Spectrum|publisher=Discogs}}</ref> Markee was instrumental in the Bristol Drum and Bass scene in the mid 1990s, Including starting the seminal 'Ruffneck Ting' and running Breakbeat Culture Record Shop and Label. Forming a partnership with Decoder, the pair released many drum and bass classic tracks as Decoder & Substance and were supported by the top players in the drum and bass scene, including Fabio & Grooverider, Andy C,  Kemistry & Storm & Doc Scott, releasing music on 31 Records and DJ SS's World of Drum and Bass Compilation and well as many EPs on their Breakbeat Culture Imprint. In 1999, wanting to break out from the confines of Drum and Bass and follow his dream of forming a group, Markee Ledge started auditioning vocalists for Kosheen. He heard Sian Evans singing on a tape given to him by a friend and invited her to his studio and then along with his music partner Decoder, formed the group Kosheen.

Kosheen signed to independent Moksha Recordings in 1999 and released three singles, which generated grass roots support. The band began recording their debut album Resist the following year, which was signed and released by BMG Records in 2001. Single "Hide U" made No. 7 in the UK Singles Chart. Upon release, Resist  album charted at No. 8 in the UK Albums Chart with the release of two subsequent singles "Catch" and "Hungry".

Second album Kokopelli charted at No. 6 in the UK and first single "All In My Head" hit No. 7.

The follow up album Damage was signed to Universal in Germany and released on Moksha in the UK, and a two further albums Independence in 2012 and a fifth and final studio album Solitude in 2013 released on Kosheen Records.

In October 2015. Markee Ledge announced Elevate'', an album that featured a selection of guest singers including Alys Be, Susie Ledge, and Jodie Elms, as well as guest producers including J Kenzo, Seven, Leon Switch, dubspeeka and DJ Youngsta from Rinse FM.

Markee's music has been used on a variety of TV program's, documentaries, ad's and films including: CSI, 24, Queer As Folk, Jake 2.0, NY/LON, (TV Shows), The US Food Channel (main channel theme music). Ads have included; Channel 5, Galaxy Radio, BMW Mini, Nokia, Erstenbank and DFS. and various premium projects for Mitsibushi, Chivas Regal, and Jamiesons.
Computer games include FIFA 2003 (EA Games),  Films  include closing titles on Julietta, and Experiment & The Test, Along with numerous usage as TV background music on Sky TV, the BBC network and ITV

Discography

With Kosheen

Studio albums

Extended plays

Singles

Solo Album

References

1974 births
Living people
Scottish electronic musicians
Musicians from Glasgow
Musicians from Bristol